This is a list of female monsters in literature:

Before 1900

Antiquity (until fifth century AD)
 Greek mythology
 Amphitrite, an oceanid or nereid and wife of Poseidon
 Callirrhoe, an oceanid and wife of Poseidon
 Doris, an oceanid and mother of the Nereids
 Echidna, half-woman and half-snake
 Electra, an oceanid and mother of the Harpies
 Eurynome, an oceanid and the third wife of Zeus
 The three Gorgon sisters (Medusa, Euryale, and Stheno), with hair made of venomous snakes, turn anyone who looks at them to stone
 The Harpies, birds with the heads of women
 Lamia, a child-eating, disfigured monster
 Metis, an oceanid and first wife of Zeus
 The Nereids, oceanids
 Scylla and Charybdis, sea monsters living on opposite sides of a narrow strait
 The Sirens, women combined with birds, whose songs lured sailors to wreck their ships
 The Sphinx, the head of a woman and the body of a lion, said to have guarded the entrance to the city of Thebes
 Styx, an oceanid and wife of Pallas

Middle Ages
 Beowulf (c. 700–1000): Grendel's mother, a monster-woman
 Prose Edda by Snorri Sturluson (c. 1220): The Valkyries, female creatures (often depicted as winged) of Norse mythology, who choose which fighters live and die in battle
 Roman de Mélusine by Jean d'Arras (1392–94): Mélusine, a water spirit of European folklore

Early modern period
 Paradise Lost by John Milton (1667): Sin, an allegorical character with the tail of a fish

Nineteenth century
 Frankenstein by Mary Shelley (1818): Female version of the creature created by Victor Frankenstein – he destroys it before it can be brought to life
 The Little Mermaid by Hans Christian Andersen (1837): The title character is a mermaid
 The Succubus by Honoré de Balzac (1837): A succubus disguised as a woman
 Carmilla by Sheridan Le Fanu (1871–2): Carmilla, a vampire who preys upon young women
 The Island of Doctor Moreau by H. G. Wells (1896): Half-finished puma-woman created by Dr Moreau, who eventually fights and kills him
 The Great God Pan by Arthur Machen (1894): Helen, the child of the character Mary and the Greek god Pan

Twentieth century

1950s
 The Lord of the Rings by J. R. R. Tolkien (1954): Shelob is a gigantic female spider

1960s
 Dragonriders of Pern series by Anne McCaffrey (1967–2012): Ramoth and --Ruth--(note: Ruth is actually  a male dragon), dragons
 Vampirella comic book series, created by Forrest J Ackerman (1969–83): Vampirella, a vampire

1970s
 Lila the Werewolf by Peter S. Beagle (1974): Lila, a young female werewolf living in New York City

1980s
 The Belgariad series by David Eddings (1982–4): Dryads, female human-like creatures, bound to oak trees
 Nights at the Circus by Angela Carter (1984): Fevvers, a circus performer claims to be part-swan
 Vampire Princess Miyu by Toshiki Hirano (1989–2002): Miyu, half-human and half-vampire

1990s
 Tehanu and The Other Wind by Ursula K. Le Guin (1990, 2001): Tehanu, part-human and part-dragon
 Anita Blake: Vampire Hunter series by Laurell K. Hamilton (1993–present): Many female characters are vampires, shapeshifters, and other creatures. In the later books, Anita Blake becomes a succubus.
 Animorphs series by K. A. Applegate and Michael Grant (1996–2001): Rachel and Cassie, can transform into any animal they touch
 Aprilhäxan by Majgull Axelsson (1997): Desirée, 'the April witch', a shape-shifting monster

Twenty-first century

2000s
 Year of the Griffin by Diana Wynne Jones (2000): Elda, a griffin
 The Southern Vampire Mysteries series by Charlaine Harris (2001–13): Sookie Stackhouse, a faerie-human hybrid. Many other female characters are vampires, fae, shapeshifters, etc.
 Mermaid Melody Pichi Pichi Pitch manga series by Michiko Yokote (2002–5): Lucia, Hanon and Rina, mermaid princesses
 Emily Windsnap series by Liz Kessler (2003–15): Emily Windsnap, half-human and half-mermaid
 The Ingo Chronicles by Helen Dunmore (2005–12): Sapphire, half-human and half-mermaid
 Twilight series by Stephenie Meyer (2005–8): Several female characters are vampires and one is a werewolf. Bella becomes a vampire in the final book of the series.
 Bone Song by John Meaney (2007): Laura Steele, a benevolent zombie woman.
 The Shifters series by Rachel Vincent (2007–10): Faythe Sanders, a werecat
 The Story of GROWL by Judy Horacek (2007): Growl, a young female monster
 Vampire Academy series by Richelle Mead (2007–10): Lissa, Jill and Rose, vampires
 The Host by Stephenie Meyer (2008): Wanderer, a female parasitic alien implanted into the body of a human woman
 Faery Rebels series by R. J. Anderson (2009–11): Knife, Linden and Rhosmari (among others), faeries
 Fire by Kristin Cashore (2009): Lady Fire, a 'human monster'
 Soul Screamer series by Rachel Vincent (2009–13): Kaylee and Nash, banshees
 The Parasol Protectorate and Finishing School series by Gail Carriger (2009–15): Sidheag Maccon, a werewolf

2010s
 iZOMBIE comic book series by Chris Roberson (2010–12): Gwen, a revenant or zombie
 A Centaur's Life manga series by 	Kei Murayama (2011–present): Himeno, a centaur
 Miss Peregrine's Home for Peculiar Children by Ransom Riggs (2011): Claire has a second mouth in the back of her head, and the Ymbrynes can shape-shift into birds
 Monster Musume manga series by Okayado (2012–present): Many of the female characters are mermaids, centaurs, etc.
 Seraphina by Rachel Hartman (2012): Seraphina, half-dragon, half-human
 The Girl with All the Gifts by M. R. Carey (2014): Melanie, infected with a zombie virus
 Talon series by Julie Kagawa (2014): Ember, a dragon hiding in human form
 Interviews with Monster Girls manga series by Petos (2015–present): Hikari (a vampire), Kyōko (a dullahan), Yuki (a snow woman), and Sakie (a succubus)
 Lorali series by Laura Dockrill (2015–17): Lorali and Aurabel, mermaids

See also

 Monster literature

References

Fiction about monsters
Female characters in fairy tales
Female legendary creatures